The PWBA Tour Championship is one of the four major events on the PWBA (Professional Women's Bowling Association) Tour. The tournament has been the final event of the PWBA Tour season since the Tour's rebirth in 2015. It has been held in Arlington, Texas (2015), Midlothian, Virginia (2016) and Richmond, Virginia (2017 through 2019). In 2021, the PWBA Tour Championship was the final event of a three-tournament "classic series" stop in Reno, Nevada.

Background
The original PWBA Tour (1960–2003) had three major events: The U.S. Women's Open (since inception), USBC Queens (since 1961), and the PWBA Players Championship (began as the PWBA Championships in 1960, and has been held on and off under similar names since). When the Tour was restarted in 2015, the PWBA Tour Championship was added to serve as a season-ending playoffs.

Prior to 2021, the PWBA Tour Championship was an invitational event with a starting field of 16 players. Any full-fledged PWBA member who won one of the prior events in the current season automatically made the field of 16, regardless of her season point total. The remaining spots in the field were filled with the women holding the highest point totals among non-winners. (Because a given player could win more than one tournament during the season, the number of at-large invitations could vary.) Invited players are then re-seeded 1 through 16 based on season point totals.

From 2015 through 2019, the tournament was set up in four bracketed elimination rounds. The #5 through #16 seeds bowled in the first round, consisting of head-to-head, best three-of-five matches. The six winners joined the #3 and #4 seeds (who earned first-round byes) in the second round, which consisted of four head-to-head, best three-of-five matches. The four winners of those matches bowled head-to-head, best three-of-five matches in the third round to determine the two bowlers who join the #1 and #2 seeds in the televised finals. The televised final round featured two head-to-head, single-elimination semifinal matches, with the #1 and #2 seeds each facing one of the survivors from the third round. The two winners of those matches then squared off in a single-game final match to determine the champion. Despite being automatically placed into the televised finals, no #1 or #2 seed had ever won the tournament in this format until 2019.

In 2021, the PWBA incorporated a "classic series" format for three tour stops. In this format, the top 24 qualifiers from two stand-alone tournaments form the starting field for a third tournament in the same location. For the 2021 Fall Classic Series, the PWBA Tour Championship was scheduled as the final of the three tournaments for the October 24–31 series, and featured a five-player stepladder final round.

Champions

2022 Event
The 2022 PWBA Tour Championship was held August 7-9 at USA Bowl in Dallas, Texas, with the 24-player starting field based on qualifying scores from two prior stand-alone tournaments in the same location. Total prize fund was $189,350, with a $50,000 top prize. The tournament used a five-player stepladder finals format. Stephanie Zavala, the #3 seed, defeated top seed and reigning champion Shannon Pluhowsky in the final match for her fourth PWBA Tour title and first major.

Prize Pool:
1. Stephanie Zavala (Downey, California) – $50,000
2. Shannon Pluhowsky (Dayton, Ohio) – $25,000
3. Maria Jose Rodriguez (Colombia) – $15,000
4. Jordan Richard (Maumee, Ohio) – $12,000
5. Shannon O'Keefe (Shiloh, Illinois) – $9,000

Past winners

References

External links
 PWBA Tour site

Ten-pin bowling competitions in the United States